Celestynów may refer to the following places:
Celestynów, Opoczno County in Łódź Voivodeship (central Poland)
Celestynów, Zgierz County in Łódź Voivodeship (central Poland)
Celestynów, Otwock County in Masovian Voivodeship (east-central Poland)
Celestynów, Zwoleń County in Masovian Voivodeship (east-central Poland)
Celestynów, Greater Poland Voivodeship (west-central Poland)